Kjetil Borry (born 16 August 1994) is a professional Belgian football defender currently playing for Dender EH in the Belgian First Division B.

He made his career league debut for Roeselare on 3 August 2013 in a Belgian Second Division 1–1 home draw against Mouscron.

References

External links 
 
 Kjetil Borry profile on the Waasland-Beveren official website

1994 births
Living people
Belgian footballers
Association football defenders
K.S.V. Roeselare players
S.K. Beveren players
F.C.V. Dender E.H. players
Belgian Pro League players
Challenger Pro League players
People from Tielt
Belgian people of Norwegian descent
Footballers from West Flanders